The Dawn of Victory is a 1971 Greek war film directed by Dimis Dadiras, written by Giorgos Lazaridis and starring Lakis Komninos, Betty Arvaniti and Miranta Kounelaki.

Plot

In 1943, Allied forces stationed in the Middle East commission a team of commandos led by Nikitas (Nikos Dadinopoulos) to destroy the largest German military airport in occupied Crete. Nikitas is a Cretan himself and the son of a drunkard Nazi collaborator (Dimos Starenios). He is in love with Martha (Miranta Kounelaki), a local villager. The commandos seek the assistance of the resistance, led by Lefteris (Lakis Komninos), who is also in love with Martha. While initially willing to cooperate, Lefteris changes his mind and refuses to help the team in their operation, believing it to be a suicide mission. Without the help of the resistance, the commando's mission is a failure. Meanwhile, after the resistance blows up a bridge, the Germans arrest Martha and Lefteris' father in an attempt to force Lefteris to turn himself in. Lefteris refuses to surrender, but instead leads his fighters in an attack on the German headquarters, rescuing the captives.

Cast
Lakis Komninos ..... Lefteris Sifakas
Betty Arvaniti ..... Chrysa
Miranda Kounelaki ..... Martha Kalogeri
Nikos Dadinopoulos ..... Nikitas Petrakis
Gikas Biniaris ..... Minas Sifakas
Ilya Livykou ..... Chrysanthi Petraki
Giorgos Velentzas ..... Colonel Petridis
Dimos Starenios ..... Frantzeskos Petrakis

Production 
The film was shot and released during the Greek military junta of 1967–74 and as such was subject to the strict censorship common at the time. Filming took place in and around Rethymno, in September and October 1970, including in the archeological site of the Fortezza castle, in the old city and the walls of its prefectural building. The remainder of the film was filmed in Chania.

Release 
The movie was screened at the Thessaloniki Film Festival in 1971 (see 1971 Thessaloniki Film Festival), where it was met with fierce disapproval from the audience. The producer threatened to stop the screening if the heckling didn't stop, without success. Miranda Kounelaki nonetheless won Best Supporting Actress for her role in the film at the festival.

Awards 
Best Supporting Actress Award (Miranda Kounelaki) at the 1971 Thessaloniki Film Festival

Cultural References 

The film is mainly remembered in Greece for a single line by Dimos Starenios' character, while he is urging the gathered villagers to cooperate with the surrounding German troops, asking for information about the resistance. The full quote is:

After none of the villagers say anything and the priest steps forward and gives a rousing patriotic speech, the German troops fire on the crowd, massacring the gathered Cretans.

See also
List of Greek films

External links

I Haravgi tis Nikis at cine.gr

1971 films
1970s war drama films
1970s Greek-language films
Greek war drama films
1971 drama films